Miles Hill is a district in Leeds. The district is located in the Chapel Allerton ward of Leeds Metropolitan Council.

As the name suggests, it is a hilltop, looking south over Leeds down the A61 Scott Hall Road. The main part is the Miles Hill estate of 1920s council houses, brick built semi-detached and terraces. A further estate, Beck Hill was built to the west in the 1970s, containing the (now closed and demolished in 2008) Miles Hill Primary School.

It is also home to Scott Hall Leisure Centre.

References

Places in Leeds
Meanwood